Kizelovskoye Urban Settlement is a municipal formation (an urban settlement) within Kizelovsky Municipal District of Perm Krai, Russia, which a part of the territory of the town of krai significance of Kizel is incorporated as. It is the only urban settlement in the municipal district.

References

Notes

Sources

Urban settlements of Russia
Geography of Perm Krai